Benedict Pereira (also Pereyra, Benet Perera, Benet Pererius) (March 4, 1536 – 6 March 1610) was a Spanish Jesuit philosopher, theologian, and exegete.

Life
Pereira was born at Ruzafa, near Valencia, in Spain.  He entered the Society of Jesus in 1552 and taught successively literature, philosophy, theology, and sacred scripture in Rome, where he died.

Works

He published eight works, and left a vast deal of manuscript. (Sommervogel, infra, mentions twelve sets.)

His main philosophical work is De communibus omnium rerum naturalium principiis et affectionibus libri quindecim (Rome, 1576).

The main difficulties of the Book of Genesis are met in Commentariorum et disputationum in Genesim tomi quattuor (Rome, 1591–1599). This is a mine of information in regard to the Deluge, Noah's Ark, the Tower of Babel, etc.,  and was highly rated by Richard Simon (Histoire critique du Vieux Testament, III, xii).

The "Commentariorum in Danielem prophetam libri sexdecim" (Rome, 1587) are much less diffuse. Other writings 
published by Pereira were five volumes of exegetical dissertations on: "Exodus", 137 dissertations (Ingolstadt, 1601); "The Epistle to the Romans", 188 dissertations (Ingolstadt, 1603); "The Apocalypse", 183 dissertations (Lyons, 1606); "The Gospel of St. John", 214 dissertations on the first nine chapters (Lyons, 1608); 144 dissertations on five following chapters (Lyons, 1610). To the fourth volume of the dissertations is appended a work of twenty-three dissertations to show that Mohammed was not the Antichrist, of the Apocalypse and of Daniel.

Debate against Clavius
Pereira was an outspoken opponent of Christopher Clavius at the Collegio Romano. The debate concerned the nature of mathematics. Pereira argued that mathematical demonstrations point to complex relations between numbers, lines, figures, etc., but lack the logical force of a demonstration from true causes or the essence of things.  Furthermore, mathematics does not have a true subject matter; it merely draws connections between different properties (Alexander, p. 69). Clavius responded in "Prolegomena" that the subject of mathematics is matter itself, since all mathematics is "immersed" in matter. The debate had broad ramifications with regard to inclusion of mathematics as a basic subject in the Jesuit curriculum.

References

 The entry cites:
Sommervogel, Bibliothèque de la Compagnie de Jesus, VI, 499-507; IX, 764; 
Hugo von Hurter, Nomenclator, I (Innsbruck, 1892), 182.

Bibliography

 Works

 Studies
 Constance Blackwell, The Vocabulary for Natural Philosophy. The “De primo cognito” Question - A preliminary Exploration: Zimara, Toletus, Pererius and Zabarella, in Lexiques et glossaires philosophiques de la Renaissance, Fédération Internationale des Instituts d’Etudes Médiévales, Louvain-la-neuve 2003 (Textes et études du Moyen Âge, 23), 287-308.
 Constance Blackwell, Thomas Aquinas against the Scotists and Platonists. The Definition of ens: Cajetano, Zimara, Pererio, Verbum Anaelecta Neolatina, 6/1 (2004), 179-188, in part. 185-188.
 Paul Richard Blum, "Cognitio falsitatis vera est". Benedictus Pererius critico della magia e della cabala, in Fabrizio Meroi and Elisabetta Scapparone (eds.): La magia nell'Europa moderna: tra antica sapienza e filosofia naturale: atti del convegno, Firenze, 2-4 ottobre 2003, Firenze: Olschki, 2007, 345-362.
 Paul Richard Blum, Benedictus Pererius: Renaissance Culture at the Origins of Jesuit Science, in Science & Education 15 (2006) 279-304.
 Paul Richard Blum, Studies on Early Modern Aristotelianism, Leiden: Brill, 2012 (Chapter Nine: Benedictus Pereirus: Renaissance Culture at the Origins of Jesuit Science, pp. 139–182).
 Marco Lamanna, "De eo enim metaphysicus agit logice". Un confronto tra Pererius e Goclenius, in Medioevo 34 (2009) 315-360.
 "Benet Perera (Pererius, 1535-1610). A Renaissance Jesuit at the Crossroads of Modernity", Quaestio. Journal for the History of Metaphysics, 14, 2014.

External links 
 The Birth of Ontology. A selection of Ontologists from 1560 to 1770

1535 births
1610 deaths
16th-century Spanish Jesuits
16th-century Spanish Roman Catholic theologians
17th-century Spanish Jesuits
16th-century male writers
Spanish philosophers
Spanish biblical scholars
17th-century male writers
16th-century Spanish philosophers
17th-century Spanish philosophers
17th-century Spanish Roman Catholic theologians